Marko Korhonen (born 18 August 1969) is a Finnish judoka. He competed in the men's half-lightweight event at the 1992 Summer Olympics.

References

External links
 

1969 births
Living people
Finnish male judoka
Olympic judoka of Finland
Judoka at the 1992 Summer Olympics
People from Kajaani
Sportspeople from Kainuu